Hailsham Railway Station was on the Cuckoo Line between Polegate and Hellingly serving the town of Hailsham. Originally built in 1849 by the London, Brighton and South Coast Railway it was a terminus station serving both passengers and livestock for the nearby market. It remained a terminus until 1880 when it was connected with Eridge on a single line railway.

Decline and closure
On 14 June 1965 the station became a terminus again when the line northward closed to passenger traffic. Freight continued northwards as far as Heathfield until 26 April 1968 when a lorry damaged a bridge at Horsebridge, north of Hailsham. It had already been earmarked for closure on 7 May, and as such it was not deemed economic to repair the bridge so line was subsequently never reopened to Heathfield. On 8 September 1968, the last passenger train left Hailsham at 10:30pm and the station and line then closed completely.

Present day
The station site was mostly cleared for a housing estate in the 1980s and all that remains now is a concrete wall on the west side of the site that held the embankment up. Part of the site is now a public car park. A bridge north of the station site also survives although heavily modified and carries a road over the former trackbed which has now become the Cuckoo Trail public footpath.  Polegate is the nearest station to Hailsham, some 4 miles distant on the Eastbourne to London line.

Line details

References

The Cuckoo Line, A.C. Elliot - Wild Swan Publications

Disused railway stations in East Sussex
Former London, Brighton and South Coast Railway stations
Railway stations in Great Britain opened in 1849
Railway stations in Great Britain closed in 1968
Beeching closures in England
1849 establishments in England
Hailsham